Matt Reid and John-Patrick Smith were the defending champions but chose not to defend their title.

Marcelo Arévalo and Roberto Maytín won the title after defeating Luke Bambridge and Joe Salisbury 6–3, 6–7(5–7), [10–7] in the final.

Seeds

Draw

References
 Main Draw
 Qualifying Draw

Kunal Patel San Francisco Open - Doubles